Georgetown is a local service district and designated place in the Canadian province of Newfoundland and Labrador. It is southeast of Bay Roberts. It had a population of 166 in 1956.

Geography 
Georgetown is in Newfoundland within Subdivision N of Division No. 1.

Demographics 

Government 
Georgetown is a local service district (LSD) that is governed by a committee responsible for the provision of certain services to the community. The chair of the LSD committee is Leonard Walsh.

See also 
List of communities in Newfoundland and Labrador
List of designated places in Newfoundland and Labrador
List of local service districts in Newfoundland and Labrador
Royal eponyms in Canada

References 

Populated coastal places in Canada
Designated places in Newfoundland and Labrador
Local service districts in Newfoundland and Labrador